is a passenger railway station located in the town of Yugawara, Ashigarashimo District,  Kanagawa Prefecture, Japan, operated by JR East.

Lines
Yugawara Station is served by  the Tōkaidō Main Line, and is located 99.4 rail kilometers from Tokyo Station.

Layout
Yugawara Station has an island platform, and a station building with automated ticket machines, Suica automated turnstiles and a "Midori no Madoguchi" service counter.

Platforms

Station history
When work began on the Tōkaidō Main Line, technology for long tunneling was limited. Initially (from 1895) the line was routed from Yugawara north to Gotemba to avoid the mountains before reaching Numazu, Shizuoka. A station was opened at Yugawara on October 1, 1924. Service to Atami began the following year initially by human-powered trolleys, followed by a steam-driven omnibus. On December 1, 1934 the Tanna Tunnel was completed, and through service on the Tōkaidō Main Line to Mishima and Numazu begun. Freight services were discontinued in 1982 and small parcel service in 1985. On April 1, 1987 along with privatization and division of the Japan National Railways, East Japan Railway Company started operating this station.

Passenger statistics
In fiscal 2019, the station was used by an average of 5,833 passengers daily (boarding passengers only).

The passenger figures (boarding passengers only) for previous years are as shown below.

Surrounding area
Yugawara Town Hall
Yagawara Onsen

See also
List of railway stations in Japan

References

Yoshikawa, Fumio. Tokaido-sen 130-nen no ayumi. Grand-Prix Publishing (2002) .

External links

Official home page 

Yugawara, Kanagawa
Railway stations in Japan opened in 1924